The 2007 edition of the Canadian Polaris Music Prize was presented on September 24, 2007 at the Phoenix Concert Theatre in Toronto.

The winning album was Patrick Watson's Close to Paradise.

According to CBC News, "finalists were drawn from submissions by more than 170 music journalists, reviewers and broadcasters across Canada."

Nominees
The prize's 10-album shortlist was announced on July 10.

 Patrick Watson, Close to Paradise
Arcade Fire, Neon Bible
The Besnard Lakes, The Besnard Lakes Are the Dark Horse
The Dears, Gang of Losers
Julie Doiron, Woke Myself Up
Feist, The Reminder
Junior Boys, So This Is Goodbye
Miracle Fortress, Five Roses
Joel Plaskett Emergency, Ashtray Rock
Chad VanGaalen, Skelliconnection

Album

As in 2006, a compilation album was released to promote the nominees. The album did not, however, include a track by Arcade Fire—although media initially reported that the Polaris committee had snubbed the band by excluding them, the committee and the band issued a joint press release confirming that the band chose not to have a track included on the album as they prefer not to participate in compilation albums.

Track listing

 "Devastation" (The Besnard Lakes)
 "Hate Then Love" (The Dears)
 "No More" (Julie Doiron)
 "Sealion" (Feist)
 "In the Morning" (Junior Boys)
 "Have You Seen in Your Dreams" (Miracle Fortress)
 "Fashionable People" (Joel Plaskett Emergency)
 "Sing Me 2 Sleep" (Chad VanGaalen)
 "Drifters" (Patrick Watson)

References

2007 in Canadian music
2007 music awards
2007